Lord Frederick Michael George David Louis Windsor (born 6 April 1979) is a British financial analyst, and the only son of Prince and Princess Michael of Kent. He is married to British actress Sophie Winkleman. He is currently 52nd in the line of succession to the British throne.

Early life and education
Lord Frederick Windsor was born on 6 April 1979 at St Mary's Hospital, London, and christened on 11 July 1979 at the Chapel Royal, St James's Palace, Westminster. A first cousin once removed of the late Queen Elizabeth II, a first cousin twice removed of Prince Philip, Duke of Edinburgh, and a second cousin of King Charles III, and his siblings, he is 52nd in the line of succession to the British throne. 

Lord Frederick and his sister, Lady Gabriella, were brought up in the Church of England.

He was educated at Wetherby School, Sunningdale, and Eton College, where he was an Oppidan Scholar, then at Magdalen College, Oxford, where he gained a 2:1 degree in Classics.

Career
After graduation, Lord Frederick worked as a fashion model for a campaign by Burberry and for the designer Tomasz Starzewski and also as a music journalist, notably for Tatler magazine. He planned to become a solicitor specializing in entertainment law, but by September 2006, according to The Times, he was working as a Chartered Financial Analyst at the investment bank JP Morgan in London. 
He is now a banker and executive director at JPMorgan Chase.

Personal life
On St Valentine's Day (14 February) 2009, Lord Frederick became engaged to the actress Sophie Winkleman. The Queen consented to the marriage, as required by the Royal Marriages Act 1772, and they were married at Hampton Court on 12 September 2009.

The couple's first child, Maud Elizabeth Daphne Marina, was born at Ronald Reagan UCLA Medical Center on 15 August 2013 in Los Angeles. She was baptised at St James's Palace in December 2013 and has Princess Eugenie among her godparents. Maud acted as a bridesmaid at the wedding of Princess Eugenie and Jack Brooksbank in 2018.

On 20 January 2016, it was announced Lord and Lady Frederick Windsor had become parents to a girl, Isabella Alexandra May, born on 16 January 2016 at Chelsea and Westminster Hospital in London. She was baptised at Kensington Palace in June 2016 with Jamie Oliver, a close friend of her mother, serving as one of the godparents.

From September 2016 until its closure in 2023, Lord Frederick was president of the charity Soldier On!, which supported vulnerable, disadvantaged or socially isolated people by participate in archaeology and heritage projects as well as personal development workshops.

On 21 February 2017, Lord Frederick was inducted into the Grand Order of Water Rats charitable fraternity.

Honours
  6 February 2002: Queen Elizabeth II Golden Jubilee Medal
  6 February 2012: Queen Elizabeth II Diamond Jubilee Medal
  6 February 2022: Queen Elizabeth II Platinum Jubilee Medal

References 

1979 births
Living people
Alumni of Magdalen College, Oxford
Frederick Windsor
British people of German descent
English financial analysts
People educated at Eton College
People educated at Sunningdale School
People educated at Wetherby School
People from Paddington